Larry Schwarz (born January 20, 1970) is an American animation producer, entrepreneur, writer, and photographer. He was the founder and CEO of now-defunct cartoon studio Animation Collective. He is best known for creating Kappa Mikey.

Early life
Schwarz was born in 1970.
He was a child actor and stand-up comedian and enjoyed playing with puppets.
Schwarz is a graduate of the University of Pennsylvania and the Benjamin N. Cardozo School of Law.

Career

After attending law school, Schwarz realized that he wanted more playfulness in his career causing him to start a toy brand.

Rumpus Toys
In 1996, while still living with his parents, Schwarz began designing his own plush toys under the Rumpus Toys brand, an online-only toy company. By winter of 1997, he was able to produce a small lot of his toys in China. The corporation was headquartered on 24th street in Chelsea, Manhattan.

That year, the original RumpusNet.com website was constructed and accessible online, with a caricature (presumably of Schwarz), catalog, and blurbs. The page has been archived and can be viewed as it appeared in 1996 on the Wayback Machine. At the time, its blurb read:Look around at toy stores these days, and it's easy to get the feeling that all of the imagination has gone out of the toy business. Each year, the titans scramble to fight their way on board the annual blockbuster movie train, recycle plastic space heroes or tired teddy bears and, of course, smother the market with endless variations of the golden girl herself. Sadly, licensing has come to dominate the industry, and the role of the toy company as an innovative creator has become an increasingly neglected niche. It is the goal of Rumpus to embrace this niche to bring creativity and fun back to the toy industry.Shortly before a toy fair in 1997 (possibly the North American International Toy Fair), Rumpus toys were insulted by representatives of Toys R Us and Schwarz's phone calls were not returned. However, specialty toy chain FAO Schwarz expressed interest for the unique toys and ordered 60 dolls for their flagship store in Manhattan. Demand for Rumpus toys increased when TV host Kathie Lee Gifford displayed organ-themed plush toy Gus Gutz on her show, after which Noodle Kidoodle and eToys.com began to invest in the brand. At this point, the Rumpus company was worth $1 million and had 9 employees.

In 1998, Rumpus participated in the New York International Toy Fair.

By 1999, the Rumpus toy brand was worth $15 million. With a staff of 36 in a polka-dotted company headquarters in the Flatiron District, Schwarz founded the Rumpus website, which housed toy sales as well as original Flash animations produced in-house. Toys designed by Schwarz included friendly Monster in My Closet, organ-displaying Gus Gutz, programmable alarm clock toy Wake Me Willy and cat toy Harry Hairball.

Schwarz's goal was for Rumpus to become an entertainment brand that created animated films alongside toy sales, "like Disney."

An archive of the site from June 2000 indicates the website was primarily built in Flash (plugin 4.0).

By April 2002, the site had shut down, and the new domain holder announced that Rumpus Toys has "closed its doors." Rumpus is now defunct and its former site, Rumpus.com, is no longer accessible.

Animation Collective

Larry Schwarz was the CEO of now-defunct animation studio based in New York City, Animation Collective. 

The studio produced Kappa Mikey (and its spin-off Dancing Sushi), Thumb Wrestling Federation, Leader Dog: The Series, Tortellini Western: The Series, Three Delivery, and Speed Racer: The Next Generation for Nicktoons Network and Ellen's Acres, HTDT, and Princess Natasha for Cartoon Network.

In addition, Schwarz served as producer of Wulin Warriors for Cartoon Network and the first season of The Incredible Crash Dummies for the Fox Box. Animation Collective also created games and webisode cartoons for AOL, including Princess Natasha.

Larry Schwarz and his Band

Schwarz is the CEO of Larry Schwarz and His Band, which produced Alien Dawn (2013-2014) for Nicktoons Network and Team Toon (2006-2013) for Cartoon Network. Both series, produced in partnership with Fremantle Media Kids and Family Entertainment, were created by Schwarz.

In February 2020, Schwarz announced that he is producing Dinosaur, Mermaid, Racecar, Pufferfish along with Believe Entertainment Group.

Publications
Schwarz co-wrote the young adult novel Romeo, Juliet and Jim along with Elise Allen.

He is also a photographer who has published male photography work in books and online.

References

External links

American animators
American animated film directors
American animated film producers
Living people
Place of birth missing (living people)
Horace Mann School alumni
1970 births